The Muravyov-Amursky Peninsula (Russian: полуостров Муравьёва-Амурского) is a peninsula in Primorsky Krai, Russia, located in the Peter the Great Gulf of the Sea of Japan. Vladivostok, the administrative center of Primorsky Krai, is located on the southern tip of the peninsula.

Geography
The peninsula is approximately 30 km long and 12 km wide, subdividing the Peter the Great Gulf into Amur Bay on its west, and Ussuri Bay on its east. The Eastern Bosphorus separates the peninsula from Russky Island, the northernmost island of the Eugénie Archipelago immediately south of the peninsula. Lazurnaya Bay on the eastern shore of the peninsula contains sand beaches.

History
Historically the Muravyov-Amursky Peninsula belonged to the region known as Manchuria, ruled by the Jurchen people that became part of the Manchu, who later became the rulers of China during the Qing dynasty. In the nineteenth century, the region unofficially known as Outer Manchuria was gradually ceded by the Qing to the Russian Empire, with the Treaty of Aigun in 1858 and the Convention of Peking in 1860. Lands ceded by Convention of Peking included the Muravyov-Amursky Peninsula, and were later organized by Russia into Primorsky Krai. The Russians named the peninsula after Count Nikolay Muravyov-Amursky, who had played a major role in Russian expansion from Siberia towards the Pacific Ocean. 

 

Peninsulas of Russia
Landforms of Primorsky Krai
Pacific Coast of Russia
Landforms of the Sea of Japan
Geography of Vladivostok